The 2014–15 Louisiana–Monroe Warhawks men's basketball team represented the University of Louisiana at Monroe in the 2014–15 NCAA Division I men's basketball season. The Warhawks, led by fifth year head coach Keith Richard, played their home games at Fant–Ewing Coliseum and were members of the Sun Belt Conference. They finished the season 24–14, 14–6 in Sun Belt play to finish in a tie for second place. They advanced to the semifinals of the Sun Belt tournament where they lost to Georgia Southern. They were invited to the College Basketball Invitational where they defeated Eastern Michigan, Mercer, and Vermont to advance to the best-of-three finals series against Loyola–Chicago. They lost to Loyola–Chicago in the finals 2 games to 0.

Roster

Schedule

|-
!colspan=9 style="background:#8C1919; color:#FFCC33;"| Regular season

|-
!colspan=9 style="background:#8C1919; color:#FFCC33;"|Sun Belt tournament

|-
!colspan=9 style="background:#8C1919; color:#FFCC33;"|College Basketball Invitational

References

Louisiana–Monroe Warhawks men's basketball seasons
Louisiana-Monroe
Louisiana-Monroe